Gazit (lit. dressed stone) is a kibbutz in northern Israel. Located in the Galilee, it falls under the jurisdiction of Jezreel Valley Regional Council.

Etymology
The name is symbolic, derived from the Book of Isaiah 9:10: "The bricks have fallen down, but we will rebuild with dressed stone". The kibbutz was originally called "Argentina A".

History
The kibbutz community was formed in 1947 by immigrants from Argentina, Poland, Romania and Turkey, and the physical kibbutz was established in 1948 on the lands of the Palestinian village of al-Tira, which was depopulated during the 1948 Arab–Israeli War, 1.5 km southwest of the village site.

Gazit became a permanent settlement in 1950. Initially a communist kibbutz, its members decided to swear allegiance to the state in 1952, expelling 22 Maki members in the process.

Economy
The main Traditional livelihood branches of the kibbutz are field crops, orchard (near Nahal Tavor ), almond and olive groves, barn, house sheep, beef, and chicken coop. The Kibbutz  also runs a community pub.
Apart from these fields, The Kibbutz's main income is largely based on the Factory " Plazit " that produces rigid plastic sheets, plastic products primarily for the food trays for the food industry (with grouping ascending ). In recent years, the factory has incorporated a number of other factories, and even bought factories in Bulgaria and Chile. In 1952 "Naaman Gazit ", a factory producing porcelain plates, was established at the kibbutz, but closed several years later.

References

Kibbutz Movement
Kibbutzim
Populated places established in 1948
Populated places in Northern District (Israel)
1948 establishments in Israel